The 1896 Arkansas gubernatorial election was held on September 7, 1896.

Incumbent Democratic Governor James Paul Clarke did not stand for re-election, but instead ran unsuccessfully for the U.S. Senate.

Democratic nominee Daniel W. Jones defeated Republican nominee Harmon L. Remmel and Populist nominee Abner W. Files with 64.26% of the vote.

General election

Candidates
Daniel W. Jones, Democratic, former Attorney General of Arkansas
Harmon L. Remmel, Republican, candidate for Governor in 1894
Abner W. Files, Populist, former Arkansas State Auditor
J. W. Miller, Prohibition, candidate for Governor in 1894

Results

Notes

References

1896
Arkansas
Gubernatorial